is a 1957 color Japanese film directed by Tomu Uchida.

Cast 
 Chiezō Kataoka as Ryunosuke Tsukue
 Nakamura Kinnosuke as Hyoma Utsugi
 Ryūnosuke Tsukigata as Shichibei
 Yumiko Hasegawa as Ohama / Otoyo
 Satomi Oka as Omatsu
 Sumiko Hidaka as Otaki
 Denjirō Ōkōchi as Toranosuke Shimada

See also
Satan's Sword (1960), starring Ichikawa Raizō VIII
The Sword of Doom (1966), starring Tatsuya Nakadai

References

External links 
 

1957 films
Films directed by Tomu Uchida
Toei Company films
Samurai films
Films based on Japanese novels
1950s Japanese films